Ron Howell may refer to:
 Ron Howell (Canadian sportsman) (1935–1992), Canadian football and ice hockey player
 Ron Howell (footballer, born 1949), English footballer
 Ron Howell (Australian footballer) (1919–2015), Australian rules footballer

See also
 Ron Howells (1927–2011), Welsh footballer